Daniel Lloyd (born 11 August 1980) is a retired English professional road racing cyclist and current commentator and presenter from Christchurch, Dorset.

Lloyd's professional victories include the Vuelta a Extremadura overall in 2008 and stages of Tour of Siam and Tour of Qinghai Lake in 2006.

He has said that his favourite race is the Tour of Flanders, one of the two major Cobbled Classics, and that the highlights of his cycling career were reaching the Champs-Élysées in the 2010 Tour de France and riding in the 2009 Tour of Qatar, which was his first race with the Cervélo TestTeam.

Career 
Lloyd started off as a mountain bike racer when he was about 13 years old, and his first major success was the Southern Area Mountain Bike Championships when he was a junior.

Lloyd was active in the professional peloton from 2001 to 2012, with his most successful years coming between 2006 and 2009. After competing for Endurasport, Flanders Cycling Team and Giant Asia Racing Team in his early years as a professional, in 2007 Lloyd signed a contract with DFL-Cyclingnews-Litespeed for whom he rode for one year. He was a member of the Irish  team in 2008.

After his contract expired at the end of 2011, he signed for the British . In November 2012, Lloyd announced his retirement from professional cycling, and became assistant directeur sportif at IG-Sigma Sport.

Race wins

Lloyd was the general classification winner of the 2008 Vuelta a Extremadura, his only overall victory in a professional stage race. The race was first held as an amateur event in 1987 and was uprated to professional status on the UCI Europe Tour in 2005. His  team started strongly with victory in the opening 22.4 km team time trial around Mérida, the only victory of Lloyd's career in that discipline. Lloyd finished in the top 20 on each of the remaining four stages which proved enough to seal overall victory by 36 seconds.

His other professional wins came while riding for Giant Asia Racing Team in 2006 during minor stage races in Asia. He started his season in January at the Tour of Siam, winning the final stage around Phuket by 36 seconds ahead of teammate Kuan Hua Lai. He returned to Asia and the Tour of Qinghai Lake in China in July, winning stage 4 on his way to 4th place overall.

Grand Tour participation

Lloyd contested a Grand Tour on three occasions, completing the race each time. He rode in the Giro d'Italia twice, finishing 109th in 2009  and 103rd in 2010.

In his sole Tour de France appearance in 2010, Lloyd finished 164th of the 170 riders who completed the race, over four hours behind initial winner Alberto Contador. He would later be upgraded several places after multiple riders were excluded from the results, including Contador which saw Andy Schleck declared the official victor. He finished 22nd on stage 11 from Sisteron to Bourg-lès-Valence, his highest placing in any individual Grand Tour stage.

Other races

Lloyd competed in seven editions of the road race at the British National Championships, with second-place finishes in 2007 and 2009. In the 2009 edition, Lloyd chased down Bradley Wiggins and Chris Froome in the latter part of the race, ultimately dropping Wiggins and finishing ahead of Froome and Peter Kennaugh but losing out to winner Kristian House in the sprint to the line.

After winning a stage and finishing 4th overall in the 2006 race for Giant Asia, Lloyd returned to the Tour of Qinghai Lake in 2007 representing DFL-Cyclingnews-Litespeed. He featured in the top 20 on each of the nine stages, finishing second overall behind Giro d'Italia stage winner Gabriele Missaglia.

Leading up to the 2008 Olympic Games, Lloyd expressed a desire to be selected for the British Olympic road race team, and put together a series of strong results which led to him being considered for selection. However, he was not included in the final squad. None of the four riders who did compete for Team GB finished the race.

In 2009, Lloyd made his sole appearance in the road race at the UCI World Championships in Mendrisio, Switzerland. Part of a nine-strong team, he was one of seven British riders not to finish the race. He also rode in four monument races, with a best finish of 45th at the Tour of Flanders in 2009, and finished 9th at the 2009 edition of Strade Bianchi.

He participated in the Tour of Britain five times, with a best overall finish of 10th in 2011. The 2012 edition of the race was his final outing as a professional cyclist.

Retirement

Lloyd now works as a broadcaster for Eurosport's cycling coverage and the Global Cycling Network (GCN). He has also served as the international English finish line commentator for the Giro d'Italia.

Lloyd is the lead presenter for GCN's news and race preview shows. He has used this platform to voice his opinion on cycling matters, for example regarding whether only amateur and unsigned riders should be eligible to compete in the men's under-23 road race at the UCI World Championships. As of 2022 the event is also open to professionals who meet the age criteria, with Lloyd opining that contracted riders should only be eligible for the elite road race event.

He also combines commentary and in-studio punditry during Eurosport and GCN coverage of Grand Tour and other major races alongside Orla Chennaoui, Adam Blythe, Robbie McEwen, Sean Kelly and others.

Major results

2006
 1st Stage 7 Tour of Siam
 4th Overall Tour of Qinghai Lake
1st Stage 4
 4th Overall Tour d'Indonesia
2007
 2nd Overall Tour of Qinghai Lake
 2nd Road race, National Road Championships
2008
 1st  Overall Vuelta a Extremadura
1st Stage 1 (TTT)
 4th Overall Volta Ciclista da Ascension
 4th Road race, National Road Championships
 6th Overall Cinturón Ciclista a Mallorca
 9th Grand Prix Pino Cerami
2009
 2nd Road race, National Road Championships
 4th Overall Tour of Qatar
 9th Monte Paschi Strade Bianche
2011
 10th Overall Tour of Britain

Grand Tour general classification results timeline

References

1980 births
Living people
British male cyclists
English male cyclists
People from Christchurch, Dorset
Sportspeople from Dorset
Cycling announcers